

Austria
 Austrian Netherlands – Prince Charles Alexander of Lorraine, Governor of the Austrian Netherlands (1744–1780)
 Lombardy – Francis III, Duke of Modena, Governor of Lombardy (1754–1771)
 Transylvania – Ladislaus Kemény, Governor of Transylvania (1758–1762)

Denmark
Danish West Indies – Christian Leberecht von Prøck, Royal Governor of the Danish West Indies (1756–1766)

France
 French Guiana – Gilbert Guillouet d'Orvilliers, Governor of French Guiana (1757–1763)
 French India – Thomas Arthur, Governor of French India (1758–1761)
 Grenada – Pierre-Claude Bonvoust d'Aulnay de Prulay, Governor of Grenada (1757–1762)
 Guadeloupe – Charles François Emmanuel Nadau du Treil, Governor of Guadeloupe (1757–1759)
 Louisiana – Louis Billouart, Governor of Louisiana (1753–1763)
 Martinique – Francis V of Beauharnais, Governor of Martinique (1757–1761)
 Mauritius –
 René Magon de la Villebague, Governor of Mauritius (1755–1759)
 Antoine Marie Desforges-Boucher, Governor of Mauritius (1759–1767)
 New France – Pierre François de Rigaud, Marquis de Vaudreuil-Cavagnal, Governor-General of New France (1755–1760)
 Réunion – Jean-Baptiste Charles Bouvet de Lozier, Governor of Reunion (1757–1763)

Great Britain
 Bahamas – John Gambier, Acting Governor of the Bahamas (1758–1760)
 Barbados – Charles Pinfold, Governor of Barbados (1756–1766)
Bengal – Robert Clive, Governor of Bengal (1757–1760)
Bermuda – William Popple, Governor of Bermuda (1755–1763)
Bombay – Richard Bouchier, Governor of Bombay (1750–1760)
British Leeward Islands – George Thomas, Governor of the Leeward Islands (1753–1766)
Connecticut – Thomas Fitch, Governor of Connecticut (1754–1766)
Gibraltar – The Earl of Home, Governor of Gibraltar (1757–1761)
 Georgia – Henry Ellis, Governor of Georgia (1757–1760)
 Gold Coast – Nassau Senior, Acting Governor of the Committee of Merchants of the Gold Coast (1757–1761)
Guernsey – John West, 1st Earl De La Warr, Governor of Guernsey (1752–1766)
Hudson's Bay Company – Sir William Baker, Governor of the Hudson's Bay Company (1760–1770)
Jamaica –
George Haldane, Governor of Jamaica (1756–1759)
Sir Henry Moore, acting Governor of Jamaica (1759–1762)
 Madras - George Pigot, President of Madras (1755–1763)
 Isle of Man – Basil Cochrane, Governor of the Isle of Man (1751–1761)Province of Maryland –  Horatio Sharpe, Governor of Maryland (1753–1769)
 Province of Massachusetts Bay – Thomas Pownall, Governor of Massachusetts (1757–1760)Province of New Hampshire – Benning Wentworth, Governor of New Hampshire (1741–1766)Province of New Jersey – Sir Francis Bernard, 1st Baronet, Governor of New Jersey (1758–1760)Province of New York – James DeLancey, acting governor of New York (1758–1760)Newfoundland –
 Richard Edwards, Commodore-Governor of Newfoundland (1757–1759)
 James Webb, Commodore-Governor of Newfoundland (1759–1761)Province of North Carolina – Arthur Dobbs, Governor of North Carolina (1753–1765)Nova Scotia – Charles Laurence, Governor of Nova Scotia (1756–1760)Province of PennsylvaniaThomas Penn, Chief Proprietor (1746–1771)
William Denney, Deputy Governor of Pennsylvania (1756–1759)
James Hamilton, Deputy Governor of Pennsylvania (1759–1763)Rhode Island – Stephen Hopkins, Governor of Rhode Island (1758–1762)Province of South Carolina – William Henry Lyttleton, Governor of South Carolina (1756–1760)Colony of Virginia –
John Campbell, 4th Earl of Loudoun, Governor of Virginia (1756–1759)
Jeffery Amherst, Governor of Virginia (1759–1768)

NetherlandsAruba – Jan van der Biest, Commander of Aruba (1756–1768)Berbice – Hendrik Jan van Rijswijck, Governor of Berbice (1755–1759)Ceylon – Jan Schreuder, Governor of Ceylon (1757–1762)Demerara – Jonathan Samuel Storm van 's Gravesende, Commander of Demerara (1752–1761)Dutch East Indies – Jacob Mossel, Governor-General of the Dutch East Indies (1750–1761)Malacca – David Boelen, Governor of Malacca (1758–1764)Essequibo – Aert Adriaenszoon Groenewegel, Governor of Essequibo (1657–1664)Netherlands Antilles – Jan da Windt, Governor of Sint Eustatius, Saba and Sint Maarten (1754–1775)Surinam – Wigbold Crommelin, Governor-General of Surinam (1757–1768)

Ottoman EmpireEgypt Eyalet – Moustafa Pasha, Wali of Egypt (1757–1760)

Portugal
 Angola – António de Vasconcelos, Governor of Angola (1758–1764)
 Macau – D. Diogo Pereira, Governor of Macau (1758–1761)
 Mozambique -
 David Marques Pereira, Governor of Mocambique, the Zambesi and Sofala (1758–1759)
 Pedro de Saldanha e Albuquerque, Governor of Mocambique, the Zambesi and Sofala (1759–1763)
 Portuguese India – Manuel de Saldanha e Albuquerque, Viceroy of Portuguese India (1758–1765)

Savoy
 Sardinia – Costa, conte della Trinitá, Viceroy of Sardinia (1755–1763)

Spain
 Chile – Manuel de Amat y Juniet, Governor of Chile (1755–1761)
 La Florida – Lucas Fernando Palacios, Governor of La Florida (1758–1761)
 New Granada – José Solís Folch de Cardona, Viceroy of New Granada (1753–1761)
 New Spain – Agustín de Ahumada, Viceroy of New Spain (1755–1760)Spanish East Indies –
 Pedro Manuel de Arandia Santisteban, Governor-General of the Spanish East Indies (1754–1759)
 Miguel Lino de Ezpeleta, Governor-General of the Spanish East Indies (1759–1761)
 Peru – José Manso de Velasco, 1st Count of Superunda, Viceroy of Peru (1745–1761)
 Puerto Rico –
 Esteban Bravo de Rivero, Governor of Puerto Rico (1757–1759)
 Mateo de Guaso Calderón, Governor of Puerto Rico (1759–1760)
 Santo Domingo –
 Francisco Rubio y Peñaranda, Governor of Santo Domingo (1751–1759)
 Manuel de Azlor y Urries, Governor of Santo Domingo (1759–1771)Trinidad''' – Pedro de La Moneda, Governor of Trinidad (1757–1760)

Colonial governors
Colonial governors
1759